The canton of Barcillonnette is a former administrative division in southeastern France. In 1999, with a registered population of 270, it had a lower population than any other French canton. It was disbanded following the French canton reorganisation which came into effect in March 2015. It consisted of 3 communes, which joined the canton of Tallard in 2015. It had 390 inhabitants in 2012.

The canton comprised the following communes:
Barcillonnette
Esparron
Vitrolles

Demographics

See also
Cantons of the Hautes-Alpes department

References

Former cantons of Hautes-Alpes
2015 disestablishments in France
States and territories disestablished in 2015